David Henderson,  (February 18, 1841 – December 7, 1922) was a Canadian merchant, banker and politician.

Biography
Born in Nelson Township, Halton County, Canada West, Henderson was educated at the Milton Grammar School and the Normal School of Toronto, and initially worked as a teacher in Nelson, later becoming a deputy registrar for the County. In 1869, he was elected a town councillor in Milton, Ontario, but not without controversy: he was accused of having switched allegiances on election day (known as there was no secret ballot) and thus had obtained his seat under false pretences.

In business
He later settled in Acton, Ontario, and operated a general store in partnership with David Darling Christie, his brother-in-law. They also owned a quarry with related lime kilns at Kelso in Nassagaweya Township. In 1881, he  established the Acton Banking Company, a private bank allied with the Bank of Hamilton, as no other bank then had a branch in the village. The bank remained in existence until 1901, and was considered to be financially sound during that time. When Acton was incorporated as a village in 1874, he  served on the village council for fifteen years, including one year as Reeve in 1880.

As an MP
He was first elected to the House of Commons of Canada for the electoral district of Halton in an 1888 by-election after the sitting MP, John Waldie, was unseated for bribery by agents. His election was seen as being significant, in that he won through the support of the rural parts of the riding while voters in Milton and Georgetown swung more towards the Opposition candidate.

Henderson was then unseated for corrupt practices by agents, and was later defeated in the resulting by-election. A Conservative, he was elected in the 1891 federal election and re-elected in 1896, 1900, 1904, 1908, and 1911.

In recognition of his long service in the House of Commons, he was made a member of the King's Privy Council for Canada in February 1916.

Electoral record

	

				

	

Note: indicates change in popular vote from to 1891 general election.

References

External links

 

1841 births
1922 deaths
Canadian bankers
Conservative Party of Canada (1867–1942) MPs
Members of the House of Commons of Canada from Ontario
Members of the King's Privy Council for Canada